Stefan Arngrim (born December 23, 1955) is a Canadian actor and musician, sometimes credited as Stephan Arngrim.

Biography
He is perhaps best known for his role as Barry Lockridge on the Irwin Allen television series Land of the Giants which aired from 1968 to 1970.  Arngrim was born in Toronto, Ontario, Canada, the son of actress Norma MacMillan and Thor Arngrim. He is the elder brother of actress Alison Arngrim, who has alleged that he regularly molested her throughout her childhood.  Stefan himself has been rumored to have been molested by a press agent and a photographer from age 12 to 16.

Filmography

 2010 The A-Team as Howard 'Crazy Howard' Little
 2011 Bringing Ashley Home as Dealer
 2010 Concrete Canyons as Decker
 2009 Angel and the Bad Man as Gamble
 2008 The Secrets of Pine Cove as Eugene Fritts 
 2006 Unnatural & Accidental as Hotel Clerk
 2005 The Fog as Blake's Compadre
 2004 The Final Cut as Oliver
 2004 The Life as Ed Nivens
 2005 The Long Weekend as Bus Driver
 1997 Misbegotten as Conan Cornelius 
 1995 Someone To Die For as Lazarro
 1995 Strange Days as Skinner
 1985 The Orkly Kid The Orkly Kid
 1982 Class of 1984 as Drugstore
 1981 Fear No Evil as Andrew Williams
 1980 Getting Wasted as Charlie
 1969 Silent Night, Lonely Night as Jerry Johnson
 1967 The Way West as William J. Tadlock Jr.

Television

 2015 - Fargo - The Bank
 2015 - Minority Report - Eyeless Man
 2014 – Arrow 2011 - The Killing - Monty 
 2009 – V – Roy
 2010 – Caprica – Amphead
 2010 - Supernatural - Redcap
 2009 – Fringe – The Store Owner
 2007 - Battlestar Galactica: Razor - Male Captive 
 2004 – Earthsea – Shire Reeve
 Flash Gordon Da Vinci's Inquest (2 episodes)
 Dead Like Me Cold Squad 
 UC: Undercover Special Unit 2 Seven Days Call of the Wild The Crow: Stairway to Heaven Millennium (2 episodes)
 Dead Man's Gun 
 Viper Police Academy: The Series Poltergeist: The Legacy The X-Files (2 episodes)
 The Sentinel Highlander: The Series The Private Tapes of Sev Banin T. J. Hooker Police Story Switch The Smith Family Land of the Giants – Series regular
 Here Come the Brides Dragnet The Virginian Gunsmoke Cyrano DeBergerac The Defenders Search for Tomorrow T.H.E. Cat 
 Combat! – Gulliver episode

Other work

Arngrim co-wrote two songs with Warren Zevon on the album Transverse City.

References

Further reading
 Dye, David. Child and Youth Actors: Filmography of Their Entire Careers, 1914-1985''. Jefferson, NC: McFarland & Co., 1988, p. 7.

External links

Stefan Arngrim's official site  (Mirror website)

1955 births
Living people
Male actors from Toronto
American male child actors
American male television actors
Canadian emigrants to the United States
Canadian people of Icelandic descent